The 1976 Shellsport International Series was a Formula Libre motor racing championship held in the United Kingdom, the series ran F1, F2, F5000 and Formula Atlantic cars in the same race. The first Shellsport International Series was contested over 13 rounds. The season started on 21 March and ended on 7 November. The Drivers' Championship was won by Englishman David Purley.

Teams and drivers

Results and standings

Drivers' standings
Points are awarded to the top ten classified finishers using the following structure:

References

Shellsport International Series